Highmead is a small village in the community of Llanwenog, Ceredigion, Wales, which is 59.2 miles (95.3 km) from Cardiff and 177.7 miles (286 km) from London. Highmead is represented in the Senedd by Elin Jones (Plaid Cymru) and is part of the Ceredigion constituency in the House of Commons. Highmead also has an abandoned old school building described as frozen in time, called Highmead School.

References

See also 
 List of localities in Wales by population

Villages in Ceredigion